This article shows all participating team squads at the 2011 Women's European Volleyball Championship, held in Italy and Serbia from 23 September to 3 October 2011.

Pool A

Head Coach: Fabrice Vial

Head Coach: Giovanni Guidetti

Head Coach: Zoran Terzić

Head Coach: Volodymyr Buzaiev

Severodonchanka 2011 squad, Inna Molodtsova, 2010-11 match report of Halychanka Ternopil and Volyn Lutsk

Pool B

Head Coach: Faig Garayev

Head Coach: Damir Jurko

Head Coach: Massimo Barbolini

Head Coach: Marco Aurelio Motta

Pool C

Head Coach: Jirí Šiller

Head Coach: Arie Selinger

Head Coach: Alojzy Świderek

Head Coach: Darko Zakoč

Pool D

Head Coach: Dragutin Baltić

Head Coach: Avital Selinger

Head Coach: Vladimir Kuzyutkin

Head Coach: Gido Vermeulen

References

External links
 2011 CEV Volleyball European Championship - Women at CEV

E
Women's European Volleyball Championships
European Volleyball Championships